Thetystrombus latus, commonly known as the Bubonian conch,  is a species of sea snail, a marine gastropod mollusk in the family Strombidae, the true conchs.

Description
The shell size varies between 70 mm and 165 mm.

Distribution
The Bubonian conch occurs in the Atlantic Ocean off West Africa, Senegal, Gabon, Cape Verde, Ascension Island and Angola.

References

 Bernard, P.A. (Ed.) (1984). Coquillages du Gabon [Shells of Gabon]. Pierre A. Bernard: Libreville, Gabon. 140, 75 plates pp
 Gofas, S.; Afonso, J.P.; Brandào, M. (Ed.). (S.a.). Conchas e Moluscos de Angola = Coquillages et Mollusques d'Angola. [Shells and molluscs of Angola]. Universidade Agostinho / Elf Aquitaine Angola: Angola. 140 pp.
 Rolán E., 2005. Malacological Fauna From The Cape Verde Archipelago. Part 1, Polyplacophora and Gastropoda''.

External links
 

Strombidae
Gastropods described in 1791
Taxa named by Johann Friedrich Gmelin
Molluscs of the Atlantic Ocean
Molluscs of Angola
Fauna of Ascension Island
Gastropods of Cape Verde
Invertebrates of Gabon